Daniel Jiménez may refer to:

Daniel Jiménez (boxer) (born 1969), former Puerto Rican boxer
Daniel Jiménez (footballer, born 1983) (born 1983), Costa Rican footballer
Daniel Jimenez (footballer, born 1988) (born 1988), Belizean footballer
Dani Jiménez (born 1990), Spanish footballer
Dany Jiménez (born 1993), Dominican professional baseball pitcher

See also
 Daniel Giménez (disambiguation)